"Wonderful" is a song by American rock band Everclear, released as the first single from their fourth studio album, Songs from an American Movie Vol. One: Learning How to Smile (2000), on May 22, 2000. The song reached number 11 on the US Billboard Hot 100, becoming the band's only top-40 hit on the Hot 100. Outside the United States, "Wonderful" reached number 12 in Iceland, number 13 in Canada, number 21 in New Zealand, number 36 in the United Kingdom, and number 38 in Australia. In Canada, the single topped the RPM Top 30 Rock Report.

Meaning
The song tells the story of a divorce as perceived by a child. Each verse of the song corresponds to a different stage of the divorce. The first verse describes the child hearing their parents fight as they try to block it out, remembering what it was like before their parents began to fight. The second verse describes the child going to school and pretending to their friends that everything is all right at home, despite what is heard in the first verse. The bridge describes the child lashing out at their parents, not wanting to comprehend that their parents have begun to grow apart and date other people.

In an October 2003 interview with Songfacts, Alexakis said about "Wonderful":

Music video
The music video, directed by Alexakis, follows two children's stories interlaced with the band singing. The children are shown happy initially but as time passes their parents fight and eventually break up. At school the kids act normal, mirroring the song. The video ends with kids jumping and happy while the band plays, sometimes in the middle of the kids. The two kids the video is about are split into two people, with each one going a different directions assumingly toward each divorced parent. The kids leave school with a smile. Alexakis can also be seen wiping a tear from his eye near the end of the video.

Track listings

US CD single
 "Wonderful"
 "Father of Mine" (remix)
 "I'm On Your Time"

UK CD single
 "Wonderful"
 "Father of Mine" (remix)
 "I'm On Your Time"
 Enhanced section (video & photos)

US 7-inch jukebox vinyl
A. "Wonderful" (radio edit)
B. "Unemployed Boyfriend"

European and Australian maxi-CD single
 "Wonderful"
 "Southern Girls"
 "Speed Racer"

Charts

Weekly charts

Year-end charts

Release history

Appearances in media
The song has been featured in several TV series, including the Scrubs episode "My Fifteen Minutes", the Cold Case episode "Dog Day Afternoons",  the Jericho episode "Why We Fight", the Daria episode "Sappy Anniversary", and the episode "Wonderful" from Mysterious Ways. It has also been featured in the movies Pay It Forward, 40 Days and 40 Nights, Cheats, and Saving Silverman.

References

2000 singles
2000 songs
Capitol Records singles
EMI Records singles
Everclear (band) songs
Song recordings produced by Neal Avron
Songs written by Art Alexakis
Songs written by Craig Montoya
Songs written by Greg Eklund
Songs about divorce